Inonotus hispidus, commonly known as shaggy bracket, is a fungus and a plant pathogen. This fungus has been used in eastern Asia as a popular remedy for many illnesses like cancer, diabetes, and other stomach ailments. In modern pharmacology, the Inonotus hispidus has aided in lowering blood glucose levels, showing anti-tumor responses and improving overall health in mice.

References

External links 
 
 Index Fungorum
 USDA ARS Fungal Database

Fungal plant pathogens and diseases
hispidus
Fungi of Europe
Fungi described in 1880